The Indian Volley League was a professional volleyball league in India and the only Volleyball League in India recognised by Volleyball Federation of India. It was launched by the Volleyball Federation of India in 2011. The inaugural edition featured six teams and the top players in the country. It has currently been replaced by the Prime Volleyball League.

Teams 
Six teams took part in first season of the Indian Volley League.

IVL 2011 

The 2011 Indian Volley League season was the debut season of the Indian Volley League, established by Volleyball federation of India in 2011. The season commenced on 29 May 2011 and ended on 24 June 2011. Chennai Spikers were the champions of the inaugural edition.

See also 

Pro Volleyball League
Prime Volleyball League

References

External links 
Volleyball Federation of India

India
Volleyball competitions in India
Sports leagues in India
Sport in India
Professional sports leagues in India